Melchor Ocampo, more commonly simply Ocampo is a town and seat of the municipality of Ocampo, in the northern Mexican state of Chihuahua. As of 2010, the town had a population of 527.

Originally settled as Jesús María, in 1861 it changed its name to honour recently assassinated Melchor Ocampo.

References

Populated places in Chihuahua (state)